Djelal Kadir (born 1946 in a shepherds' village on the island of  Cyprus) is the Edwin Erle Sparks Professor of Comparative Literature at Pennsylvania State University, University Park, where he teaches literatures of the Americas, modernism, postmodernism, world literature, and classical and modern theory, and where he has been the recipient of departmental teaching awards and the College Distinguished Service Medal.  He has published more than one hundred articles and is the author and editor of a dozen books on the Americas, globalization, world literature, postcolonialism, modernism and literary theory as well as editor of more than twenty special issues of literary periodicals. Kadir’s own poetry and scholarly works have been translated into Greek, Polish, Turkish, French, Arabic, and Spanish.

A regular lecturer at institutions around the world, Kadir lives in State College, Pennsylvania, with wife Juana Celia Djelal.

Career

Between 1991 and 1997 Kadir served as the Editor of World Literature Today (WLT) where he published some twenty special issues on postcolonial figures and on a number of national literatures in historic realignment. He edited monographic issues on such authors as Assia Djebar, Luisa Valenzuela, Kamau Brathwaite, Maryse Condé, João Cabral de Melo Neto, and Manuel Puig. He also published, in collaboration with UNESCO, a number of special issues on shifting literary cultures at critical junctures in their history such as contemporary Indian (American) literatures, Russian literatures after perestroika, contemporary Australian literature, literatures of India fifty years after independence, German literature after re-unification, post-apartheid South African literature, literatures of post-Soviet Central Asia. Kadir has also served as guest-editor for special issues of a number of international journals such as Annals of Scholarship (on Christopher Columbus 1992), Siglo XX/20th Century: Critique & Cultural Discourse (on the cultural criticism of Nobel laureate Octavio Paz), Neohelicon  (on literary theory, globalization, and comparative literature), PMLA (on America and American Studies), and Comparative Literature Studies (on globalization and world literature). In 1994, in conjunction with the American Academy of Poets, Kadir translated and edited the poetry of Brazilian poet João Cabral de Melo Neto for the Wesleyan Poetry Series.

Kadir serves as senior fellow and board member of a number of international organizations such as Synapsis: The European School of Comparative Studies; The Stockholm Collegium of World Literary History; and the Institute for World Literature; Fundación Xavier de Salas; Council on National Literatures; and the International Writers Center. He is the Founding President of the International American Studies Association and has served regularly on the board of a number of other professional organizations in his field such as the American Comparative Literature Association, the International Comparative Literature Association whose Standing Committee on Literary Theory he chaired for a number of years.

Education

Kadir earned his B.A. from Yale University in 1969 and his Ph.D. from the University of New Mexico in 1972. He previously taught at Purdue University (1973–1991) and at the University of Oklahoma (1991–1997), where he served as editor of World Literature Today and Chairman of the Neustadt International Prize for Literature. As an accomplished equestrian, he also served as the faculty advisor to the University of Oklahoma Polo Team, an NCAA sports Club. He was the recipient of the State Governor’s “Marilyn Douglas Memorial Award” for outstanding contribution as member of the Oklahoma Arts Council (1991–1996). He is a member of Italy’s Accademia da Monta di Lavoro, which has conducted Italy’s annual equine “transhumance” for centuries.

Publications

Books 
 Memos from the Besieged City: Lifelines for Cultural Sustainability (Stanford UP, 2011 )
 Routledge Companion to World Literature (co-editor with Theo D’Haen and David Damrosch) (Routledge, 2011 )
 Longman Anthology of World Literature. (6 vols. Co-editor with David Damrosch et al.) (Pearson/Longman, 2004)
 Comparative History of Latin American Literary Cultures (3 vols. co-editor with Mario Valdés) (Oxford University Press, 2004)
 How Far Is America From Here? (co-editor with Theo D'haen, Paul Giles, and Lois Parkinson Zamora) (Rodopi, 2005)
 Other Modernisms in An Age of  Globalization (co-editor with Dorothea Löbbermann) (Winter Verlag, 2002).
 João Cabral de Melo Neto: Selected Poetry 1937-1990 (editor) (Wesleyan & UP of New England, 1994)
 The Other Writing:  Postcolonial Essays in Latin America's Writing Culture (Purdue UP, 1993)
 Columbus and the Ends of the Earth: Europe's Prophetic Rhetoric As Conquering Ideology (Univ. of California Press, 1992)
 Questing Fictions: Latin America's Family Romance (University of Minnesota Press, 1986)
 Triple Espera: Novelas Cortas de Hispanoamérica  (editor) (Harcourt Brace, 1976)
 Juan Carlos Onetti (Twayne, 1977)

Articles and book chapters 

  "Toward Decentralized American Studies", The Americanist: Warsaw Journal for the Study of the United States. Special issue, The Politics of American Studies. XXIII (2006)
  "Le monde tel qu’on le fait: la valeur prédicative de 'monde' et de 'globalisation' dans la pratique de la littérature comparée", Revue de Sciences Humaines. Special issue, La valeur, Dominique Vaugeois, guest editor 283.3 (2006)
  "International American Studies and The International American Studies Association: President's Report", in Americas' Worlds and the World's Americas/Les mondes des Amériques et les Amériques du monde, Amaryll Chanady, George Handley, Patrick Imbert, eds.  Ottawa: University of Ottawa/Université d'Ottawa/Legas, 2006
  "Iron Square Memoranda (Mutatis, Mutandis): For A World Literary History", in Studying Transcultural Literary History, Gunilla Lindberg-Wada, ed. Berlin & New York: de Gruyter, 2006
  "Comparative Literature in An Age Become Tlön", Comparative Critical Studies: The Journal of the British Comparative Literature Association. 3.1-2 (2006)
  "America", Theory, Culture & Society, Special issue Problematizing Global Knowledge, Mike Featherstone, Couze Venn, Ryan Bishop, and John Phillips, eds. 23.2-3 (March–May 2006)
  "Comparative Literature in An Age of Terrorism", in Comparative Literature in An Age of Globalization, Haun Saussy, ed. Baltimore: Johns Hopkins UP, 2006
  "Il culto dell’igiene: Neoliberalismo e sanità pedagogica", Contaminazioni. Quaderni di Synapsis, 4, Paolo Zanotti, ed. Firenze: Le Monnier, 2005
  "Nación y cultura en el mundo contemporáneo", Interculturalidad & Traducción/Interculturality & Translation: International Review 1.1 (2005)
  "Reformation and Counter-reformation: Epistemic Shifts in American Studies at the Beginning of the Twenty-first Century", Transit Circle: Revista da Associação Brasileira de Estudos Americanos, 1.1 August 2005
  "Pragmatismo y patriotismo: William James cien años después", in Aproximaciones a la obra de William James: La formulación del pragmatismo. Jaime de Salas & Félix Martín, eds. Madrid: Universidad Complutense de Madrid. Colección Razón y Sociedad, 2005
  "Defending America Against Its Devotees", Comparative American Studies 2:2 (2004)
  "To World, To Globalize: Comparative Literature's Crossroads", Comparative Literature Studies 41:1 (2004)
  "Lo stato attuale e gli American Studies", America at Large: Americanistica transnazionale e nuova comparatistica. Donatella Izzo & Giorgio Mariani, eds. Milano: I Libri di Acoma, 2004.
  "Totalization, Totalitarianism, and Tlön: Borges' Cautionary Tale", in Reescrituras. Luz Rodríguez-Carranza y Marilene Nagle, eds. Amsterdam and New York: Editions Rodopi, 2003.
  "Introduction: America and its Studies", PMLA, 118:1 (2003)
  "La cospirazione della cultura e la cultura della conspirazione", in Cospirazione, trame, ed. Simona Micali.  Quaderni di Synapsis 2.  Firenze: Le Monnier, 2003.
  "Arborescent Paz, Interlineal Poetry", in Octavio Paz (Modern Critical Views). Harold Bloom, ed., Langhorne, PA: Chelsea House Publishers, 2002.
  "The Spatial Logic of Just-in-Time Modernism", in Other Modernisms in An Age of Globalization. Djelal Kadir and Dorothea Loebbermann, eds. Heidelberg: Universitaetsverlag C. Winter Verlag, 2002
  "The Commons of History", in Do the Americas Have a Common Literary History? Barbara Buchenau & Annette Paatz, eds. Inter-American Literary Studies Series.  Frankfurt: Peter Lang, 2002
  "Comparative Literature, the Transnational and the Global", Neohelicon 28:1 (Winter 2001)
  "Heidegger, Hölderlin, and the 'Essence of Philosophy': An Adversative Conversation," Neohelicon, 27:1 (Winter 2000)
  "Afterwords" to Stepmother Tongue: From Nationalism to Multiculturalism—Literatures of Cyprus, Greece, & Turkey.  M. Yashin, ed.  London: Middlesex University Press, 1999
  "Tsaloumas' Apostrophe", Essays on the Poetry of Dimitris Tsaloumas. Helen Nikas, ed. Melbourne, Australia: Owl Publishing/ La Trobe University, 1999.
  "Of Letters and Literacy", Canadian Review of Comparative Literature / Revue Canadienne de Littérature Comparée 29: 2 (June 1997).
  "Collaborative Historiography: A Comparative Literary History of Latin America", co-authored with Linda Hutcheon and Mario Valdés. American Council of Learned Societies. ACLS Occasional Paper No. 35.  1996.
  "Rhetoric and the Question of Knowing", Variaciones Borges 2/(1996).
  "Trials of an Amatory Tradition", Journal of the Association for the Interdisciplinary Study of the Arts, Autumn 1995.
  "Proemio: Personificaciones primarias" in La situación autobiográfica,.  Juan Orbe, ed. Buenos Aires: Ediciones Corregidor, 1995.
  "The Posts of Coloniality," Canadian Review of Comparative Literature / Revue Canadienne de Littérature Comparée,  27:3 (September 1995).
  "Comparative Literature Hinternational [sic]", editor's introduction to Comparative Literature: States of the Art, special issue of World Literature Today 69:2 (Spring 1995).
  "What Are We After?" Editor's introduction to Postmodernism/Postcolonialism, a special issue of World Literature Today 69:1 (Winter 1995). Re-printed in Borders & Margins: Post-Modernism & Post-Colonialism.  Fernando de Toro, ed. Theorie und Kritik der Kultur und Literatur / Theory & Criticism of Culture and Literature Series.  Frankfurt-am-Main: Vervuert Verlag, 1995.
  "On the ars combinatoria of Plato's Cratylus, " in Plato and Postmodernism.  Steven Shankman, ed. Glenside, PA: The Aldine Press, Ltd. 1994.
  "Columbus & Our Culture Wars," Forum Italicum: Columbus Supplement.  Stony Brook: SUNY, 1993. 94-100.
  "Divine Primitives: Primitives Divined," Before Columbus Review: A Quarterly Review of Multicultural Literature 3:2 Fall/Winter (1992) 26-29.
  "Next Door: Writing Elsewhere", The Review of Contemporary Fiction 12:2 (Summer 1992) 60-69.
  "The Writing of America: Graphic Conquests," Annals of Scholarship 8:2  (1991) 145-161.
  "America's Anxious Foundations," in Perspectives on Culture and Society II.  Warren Vander Hill, ed. Muncie, IN: Ball State University Press, 1991. 41–63.
  "Huevos Rancheros", [editor's title, alas!] Rolling Stock 17/18, 1990. Review essay on Christopher Unborn by Carlos Fuentes. Trans. Alfred MacAdam (New York: Farrar, Straus, Giroux, 1989).
  "Imperio y Providencia en el Nuevo Mundo: Colón y el Libro de las Profecías (1501)", Revista de Crítica Literaria Latinoamericana 14:28 (1988) 329–35.
  "Cultural De-Liberations: States of Emergency". Occasional Papers, no. 23. Center for Humanistic Studies, University of Minnesota, 1987.
  "The Survival of Theory and the Surviving Fictions of Latin America", Modern Fiction Studies 32:3 (1986) 383–96.
  "Juan Carlos Onetti", in Critical Survey of Long Fiction. Frank N. Magill, ed. La Cañada, CA/ Washington, D.C.: Salem Press, 1984. 1205-1215.
  "Historia y novela: La tramatización de la palabra", in Historia y ficción en la narrativa hispanoamericana. Roberto González Echevarría, ed. Caracas: Monte Avila  Editores, 1984. 297–307.
  "Prose Fiction: Andean Countries" section of Handbook of Latin American Studies. Regular contributor vols. 40–52 (1978–1990). Dolores Martin, ed. Austin: University of Texas Press.
  "The New World as Proemial Trope", Cream City Review (University of Wisconsin, Milwaukee, Department of English) 7:2 (1982) 6-13.
  "Carlos Fuentes: Culpable inocencia y profeta del pasado", Revista Iberoamericana 116/17 (1981), 55–66.
  "Susurros de Ezra Pound en Dejemos hablar al viento", Texto Crítico  18/19 (1981) 80–86.
  "The Architectonic Principle of Cien años de soledad and the Vichian Theory of History", Romance Quarterly 24:3 (1977) 251–61.
  "Intimations of Terror in Borges' Metaphysics", Symposium 31:3 (1977) 196–211.
  "Same Voices, Other Tombs: Structures of Mexican Gothic", Studies in Twentieth Century Literature (Fall 1976), 47–64.
  "Stalking the Oxen of the Sun and Felling the Sacred Cows: Joyce's Ulysses and Cabrera Infante's Three Trapped Tigers", Latin American Literary Review 3:8 (1976) 15–22.
  "Another Sense of the Past: Henry James' The Aspern Papers and Carlos Fuentes' Aura", Revue de Littérature Comparée (1976) 448-54.
  "Nostalgia or Nihilism: Pop Art and the New Spanish American Novel", Journal of Spanish Studies: Twentieth Century 2:3 (1975) 127-35.
  "Inquisición: Leopoldo Lugones, cuentista fatal", Revista de Estudios Hispánicos 9:3 (1975) 309-11.
  "A Mythical Re-enactment: Julio Cortázar's El perseguidor", Latin American Literary Review 2:3 (1974) 63-73.
  "Empatía negativa en El pozo de Juan Carlos Onetti", in Homenaje a Juan Carlos Onetti. Helmy Giacoman, ed. New York: Las Américas, 1974. 207–14.
  "Borges the Heresiarch Mutakallimun", Modern Fiction Studies 19:3 (1973) 461–68.
  "Neruda and Whitman: Short-circuiting the Body Electric", Pacific Coast Philology 8 (1973) 16–23.

References

External links
 Academic Website of Djelal Kadir

1946 births
Living people
Comparative literature academics
Pennsylvania State University faculty
Purdue University faculty
University of New Mexico alumni
Yale University alumni